Franklin Azzi (French: [fʁɑ̃klɛ̃ azzi]; born 12 August 1975 in Paris), is a French architect. He is a graduate from the École Spéciale d'Architecture, and the Glasgow School of Art.  He is the founder of Franklin Azzi Architecture, an agency based in the 2nd arrondissement of Paris.

Early life and education 
During his years of obligatory military service, Azzi did his first architectural works, in India and Turkey.  He studied at the ESA  École Spéciale d'Architecture, where he had a significant encounter with Paul Virilio, a French cultural theorist and urbanist. His practice mixing different areas of applied arts with architecture was inspired by his time at the Glasgow School of Art, where interdisciplinary studies are highly encouraged.

Career 
Since 2006, Azzi has been head of  Franklin Azzi Architecture, a multidisciplinary team, including architects, interior designers, decorators, graphic designers, art historians, and also parametric design researchers. His first project with  public funding was the Center for American Francophonie in Québec City. He then completed other public projects, the restoration of the Alstom halls in Nantes, which now hosts the school of the :fr:École supérieure des beaux-arts de Nantes Métropole; the restructuring of the Mame Printing Houses in Tours, a 1950 building by Bernard Zehrfuss and Jean Prouvé; the reconversion of the Tri Postal and the Gare Saint-Sauveur into two cultural centers, in Lille.  In 2013, he worked with the City of Paris on the redevelopment of the Banks of the Seine, turning 2,5 kilometers of embankment into a pedestrian area.

He also completed private projects: the Docks  in Saint-Ouen, the seat of La Française Group, in Paris, the first Mama Shelter tower in Dubai, for the AccorHotels group. He took part in the Grand Paris Express project with the Chevilly-Larue station. In 2017, he was chosen to lead « the Tour Montparnasse metamorphosis », with the Nouvelle AOM team.

Azzi has always considered his work as "global architecture", as he has had a multidisciplinary background. In 2014, he founded Franklin Azzi Design, with Noemie Goddard. He collaborated with artists like Tatiana Trouvé, designers like Robert Carr, but also fashion designers, such as Bali Barret, Christophe Lemaire and Isabel Marant.

Projects

Current projects 
 Laureate of the international contest for the rehabilitation of the Tour Montparnasse, with the Nouvelle AOM group, Paris, France. 
In July 2016, an international contest was launched for the metamorphosis of the Tour Montparnasse, with 700 international architecture agencies participating. His agency joined two other Parisian agencies (Chartier Dalix Architectes and Hardel et Le Bihan Architectes) to form the Nouvelle AOM group, and submit a proposition. They set their design workshop in the 44th floor of the Tower. In September 2017, the Nouvelle AOM group won and revealed their rehabilitation project, focusing on redefining the visual identity of the Tower, but also on comfort and energetic performances issues. The construction works are planned to last from 2019 to 2023, so that the Tower will be ready for the 2024 Olympics in Paris.
 Mama Shelter Tower for the AccordHotels group, Dubai 
 Technicolor headquarters, rue du Renard, Paris
 Arche de la Défense Campus, Puteaux, France&
 Workstation Tower, La Défense, Courbevoie, France
 Bac Raspail Grenelle - Emerige, Paris, France
 Grand Paris Express Station, Chevilly, France

Cultural centers 
 2007 Center for American Francophonie, Québec City, Canada 
 2009: Saint Sauveur Station, Lille, France 
 2010: Tri postal, Lille, France 
 2015: Mame Printing Houses, Tours, France

Stores 
His first stores for Bali Barret in Japan were inaugurated in 2004.
Since then, he achieved many projects for Isabel Marant, Christophe Lemaire, John Galliano, H&M or Lacoste.

Headquarters and offices 

 2012 : Isabel Marant headquarters, Paris, France
 2013 : Docks en Seine, Saint-Ouen, France 
 2015 : La Française headquarters, Paris, France

Restaurants 
 2010 : « Théâtre du Renard », Paris, France 
 2013 : Le Yoyo - Palais de Tokyo, Paris, France& 
 2016 : Holiday Café, Paris, France 
 2017 : Blend Restaurants, Paris, France

Housing 
 2007 : Maison VW, Yport, France
 2013 : Cardinet Chalabre, Paris, France

Urban facilities 

 2013 : Berges de Seine, Paris, France 
 2017 : Halles Alstom, île de Nantes, France

Installations 
 2009 : Installations in the Grands Moulins, Paris, France
 2010 : Pavillon Lille Europe for the Universal Exhibition, Shanghai, China

Exhibitions 
 2007 : Exo-Architecture at the Pavillon de l'Arsenal
 2014 : "One building, how many lives ?" at the Cité de l'Architecture et du Patrimoine

Publications

Monographs 
 IN/OUT : Franklin Azzi Architecture, Ante Prima/AAM editions, 2014 (in French and in English)

Bibliography 

 2008 : You can be young and an architect, based on the true story of Lan Architecture, p. 8-27. 
 2008 : Les salons de l'IFA (Dinner n°11), p. 100-105.
 2008 : Strike a pose : eccentric architecture and spectacular spaces, p. 190-193.
 2010 : 150 Best Eco House Ideas, p. 412-419. 
 2014 : Sports : Portrait d'une métropole, p. 115-119.
 2015 : One building, how many lives ?, p. 94-95.
 2015 : Lille respire - Concours Bas Carbone 2015

Awards 
 2008 : AJAP Award (Albums des jeunes architectes et paysagistes), presented by the Culture and Communication Ministry.

References

External links 
 

21st-century French architects
1975 births
Living people
Architects from Paris
École Spéciale d'Architecture alumni
Alumni of the Glasgow School of Art